"Dream Baby (How Long Must I Dream)" is a song written by Cindy Walker which was first recorded and released by Roy Orbison originally as a non-album single in 1962. It was a big international hit for Orbison, reaching number 2 in both the Australian and the UK singles charts and number 4 in the U.S. Billboard. It was also a top ten hit in Canada and Norway.  Five months later, "Dream Baby" was included on Orbison's Greatest Hits compilation LP.

Chart history

Weekly charts

Year-end charts

Musicians:
Roy Orbison - Vocal
Fred Carter, Jr. - Rhythm guitar 
Grady Martin - Electric guitar
Bob Moore - Upright Bass
Buddy Harmon - Drums
Boots Randolph - Saxophone
unknown - piano

Glen Campbell version
American country music artist Glen Campbell covered "Dream Baby" in 1971.  It was released in March of that year as the lead single from his album The Last Time I Saw Her. The song peaked at number 7 on the U.S. Billboard Hot Country Singles chart. It also reached number 4 on the RPM Country Tracks chart in Canada.

Lacy J. Dalton cover
A 1983 cover by American country music artist Lacy J. Dalton peaked at number 9 on the U.S. Billboard Hot Country Singles chart.

Other cover versions
The Beatles performed the song in front of a live studio audience on 7 March 1962 for the BBC radio programme Teenager's Turn, which was broadcast the following day. This was the Beatles' first ever BBC radio session. It has never been officially issued.

"Dream Baby" was also covered by Jerry Lee Lewis in 1967 and also by Waylon Jennings.

References

1962 singles
1971 singles
1983 singles
Glen Campbell songs
Lacy J. Dalton songs
Songs written by Cindy Walker
Roy Orbison songs
Monument Records singles
Capitol Records singles
Song recordings produced by Al De Lory
1962 songs